Ziyang (资阳市) is a city in Sichuan province, China.

Ziyang or Tzu-yang may also refer to:

Ziyang County (紫阳县), in Ankang, Shaanxi, China
Ziyang District (资阳区), in Yiyang, Hunan, China
Zhao Ziyang (赵紫阳; 1919–2005), Chinese politician

See also
Yang Zi (disambiguation)